HD 192310 b is an exoplanet orbiting the star HD 192310 (HR 7722). It orbits its parent star with a semimajor axis of 0.32 ± 0.005 AU, an eccentricity of 0.13 ± 0.04. and an orbital period of 74.72 days.

The Neptune-sized planet has at least 21 times the mass of Earth and 3 to 4 times its diameter.

HD 192310 b was discovered on 1 November 2010 and lies within the inner edge of the habitable zone of HD 192310.

See also 
 List of star systems within 25–30 light-years

References 

Exoplanets detected by radial velocity
Exoplanets discovered in 2010
Capricornus (constellation)